James Patrick Kelly was an Irish Fianna Fáil politician who served for eleven years as a Teachta Dála (TD) from 1932 to 1943.

An accountant by profession, Kelly first stood as a candidate for Dáil Éireann at the June 1927 general election for the Meath constituency, but was not successful. He was defeated again at the September 1927 general election, but was elected at the 1932 general election, taking his seat in the 7th Dáil. He was re-elected for the same constituency at the 1933 general election, and for the new Meath–Westmeath constituency at the 1937 general election.

He was returned again at the 1938 general election, but lost his seat at the 1943 general election. He stood again the following year at the 1944 general election, but was not successful.

References

Fianna Fáil TDs
Year of birth missing
Year of death missing
Members of the 7th Dáil
Members of the 8th Dáil
Members of the 9th Dáil
Members of the 10th Dáil